Sashikubo Dam is a rockfill dam located in Aomori Prefecture in Japan. The dam is used for irrigation. The catchment area of the dam is 28.4 km2. The dam impounds about 24  ha of land when full and can store 2922 thousand cubic meters of water. The construction of the dam was started on 1985 and completed in 2011.

References

Dams in Aomori Prefecture
2011 establishments in Japan